Bernard Henderson (April 12, 1899 – June 6, 1966), nicknamed "Barnyard", was a Major League Baseball pitcher who played for one season. He pitched in two games for the Cleveland Indians during the 1921 Cleveland Indians season.

External links

1899 births
1966 deaths
Major League Baseball pitchers
Cleveland Indians players
Baseball players from Texas
Place of birth missing
Place of death missing
Texas A&M Aggies baseball players